Valbrona is a comune (municipality) in the Province of Como in the Italian region Lombardy, located about  north of Milan and about  northeast of Como.

Valbrona borders the following municipalities: Abbadia Lariana, Asso, Canzo, Lasnigo, Mandello del Lario, Oliveto Lario, Valmadrera.

Demographic evolution

References

Cities and towns in Lombardy